Mouth to Mouth is a 2005 drama starring Elliot Page. The first feature film written and directed by Canadian-born Alison Murray, it won the Grand Chameleon award at the 2005 Brooklyn International Film Festival. It was shot on location in England, France, Germany and Portugal.

Plot
Sherry (Elliot Page), a disillusioned American teen living on the streets of Europe, happens across the street collective S*P*A*R*K (Street People Armed with Radical Knowledge), led by Harry (Eric Thal) and immediately follows suit, joining their caravan of orphans, runaways, deadbeats, and punks on a journey around Europe, recruiting new fragile souls. Along the way, a child member of the group, Manson, is accidentally killed when he jumps into a garbage can and hits an artery and his friend Mad Ax (Maxwell McGabe Lokos) becomes heavily depressed. While intoxicated, Sherry calls her mother, Rose, much to Harry's anger.

Later, at a bacchanal with a bonfire, Nancy takes drugs, triggering an asthma attack that's treated by her inhaler. Sherry mentally replaces an idyll lover's face with Harry's, which disturbs her and she departs. As Sherry hitchhikes away, Rose sees her and picks her up. Tensions arise between them on the drive and Sherry gets out of the car and returns on foot to the S*P*A*R*K group, where several of the female and male members have shaved their heads and have new rules such as no sex or alcohol.

Rose soon finds her and inexplicably wants to join S*P*A*R*K. She is initiated into the group after selling her house in Lisbon and donating the proceedings to S*P*A*R*K, and she too has her head shaved. After getting half her hair shaved off, Sherry feels that she's unwanted there by Harry and tells him about it. He then kisses her, they have sex, after which he abandons and then publicly shames her. The rest of her hair is shaved and Sherry begins to see that Harry is psychologically abusing the entire group.

S*P*A*R*K member Nancy propositions Sherry to leave the group and Sherry agrees. When Harry confronts Nancy, she says 'We only wanted to have some fun', accidentally implicating someone else. Harry thinks that Ax is the second person, but Sherry steps forward and tells everyone that it was her idea, because whatever good was once in S*P*A*R*K is now gone. Harry throws Sherry and Nancy into a well. Nancy begins to have a panic attack which triggers her asthma and Sherry screams for help, but everyone ignores them. Ax eventually reels Sherry and Nancy up from the well, but Nancy is already dead.  Sherry and Ax (with a few others following them) escape the camp, hitchhiking once again.

Cast 
 Elliot Page as Sherry Green
 Natasha Wightman as Rose
 Beatrice Brown as Nancy
 Maxwell McCabe-Lokos as Mad Ax
 Eric Thal as Harry
 August Diehl as Tiger
 Diana Greenwood as Dog
 Jim Sturgess as Red

Notes

External links 
 
 
 

2005 films
British drama films
British coming-of-age drama films
2000s coming-of-age drama films
Films shot in Portugal
Teensploitation
2005 drama films
2000s English-language films
2000s British films